Sugule  was a Somali poet. Sugule is considered to be one of the greatest composers, poets and playwrights of the Somali language.

Overview
Sugule was born in 1936 in Hargeisa in former British Somaliland (now Somaliland) to an Isaaq family from the Habar Yoonis subclan. 
Sugule was against the Siad Barre regime who ruled Somalia from 1969 to 1991, that used the method "kill all but the crows" in Somaliland   Sugule wrote numerous plays, poems and songs against dictator Siad Barre that led to his imprisonment for several years.

Sugule died at the age of 80 in Abu Dhabi on 12 January 2016 and was later buried in his hometown of Hargeisa Somaliland.

References

1936 births
2016 deaths
Somaliland poets
People from Hargeisa
20th-century poets